Alessio Cristiani (born 24 December 1989) is an Italian football player. He plays for Acireale.

Club career
He made his Serie C debut for Viareggio on 23 August 2009 in a game against Cremonese.

On 3 September 2019, he joined Serie D club Messina.

On 27 September 2021, he moved to Acireale in Serie D.

References

External links
 

1989 births
Sportspeople from Livorno
Living people
Italian footballers
F.C. Esperia Viareggio players
Benevento Calcio players
Como 1907 players
A.C.N. Siena 1904 players
A.C.R. Messina players
S.S.D. Acireale Calcio 1946 players
Serie B players
Serie C players
Serie D players
Association football midfielders
Footballers from Tuscany